is a retired Japanese hammer thrower. He competed at the 1972, 1976 and 1984 Olympics and finished in 8th, 11th and 14th place, respectively. He was the flag bearer for Japan at the 1984 Olympics.

On September 29, 1972, Murofushi married Serafina Moritz, a javelin thrower who competed internationally for Romania. Both of their children, Koji Murofushi and Yuka Murofushi, are retired Olympic hammer throwers.

Murofushi tried sumo and shot put before changing to the hammer. In 1984 he set a Japanese record at 75.96 m that stood until 1998 when it was broken by his son Koji.

International competitions

See also
List of professional sports families 
List of flag bearers for Japan at the Olympics
List of Asian Games medalists in athletics

References

1945 births
Living people
Sportspeople from Tangshan
Athletes from Hebei
Japanese male hammer throwers
Olympic male hammer throwers
Olympic athletes of Japan
Athletes (track and field) at the 1972 Summer Olympics
Athletes (track and field) at the 1976 Summer Olympics
Athletes (track and field) at the 1984 Summer Olympics
Asian Games gold medalists for Japan
Asian Games silver medalists for Japan
Asian Games gold medalists in athletics (track and field)
Asian Games medalists in athletics (track and field)
Athletes (track and field) at the 1966 Asian Games
Athletes (track and field) at the 1970 Asian Games
Athletes (track and field) at the 1974 Asian Games
Athletes (track and field) at the 1978 Asian Games
Athletes (track and field) at the 1982 Asian Games
Athletes (track and field) at the 1986 Asian Games
Medalists at the 1966 Asian Games
Medalists at the 1970 Asian Games
Medalists at the 1974 Asian Games
Medalists at the 1978 Asian Games
Medalists at the 1982 Asian Games
Medalists at the 1986 Asian Games
Universiade medalists in athletics (track and field)
Universiade bronze medalists for Japan
Medalists at the 1967 Summer Universiade
World Athletics Championships athletes for Japan
Asian Athletics Championships winners
Japan Championships in Athletics winners
Nippon Paper Industries
20th-century Japanese people